Coleophora moronella is a species of moth in the family Coleophoridae. It is found in Mongolia.

References

moronella
Moths of Asia
Moths described in 1975